Samurai Cop is a 1991 American direct-to-video action film written, coproduced and directed by Amir Shervan and starring Robert Z'Dar, Matt Hannon and Mark Frazer. It has attained a cult following.

Plot
When a renegade Japanese gang known as the Katana take control of the cocaine trade in Los Angeles, the LAPD transfer in a "samurai" policeman from the SDPD to help tackle the problem. Joe Marshall has been trained by the masters in Japan and “speaks fluent Japanese”, but dresses like a commoner.

An attempted bust meets with failure after a bizarre car chase leads to multiple deaths and the only witness burned and unable to testify. Katana boss Fuj Fujiyama orders the injured Katana member to be executed and his head displayed on a piano to remind all remaining Katana members of their code of silence. Joe and his partner Frank confront the Katana at the Carlos'n Charlie's restaurant on Sunset Boulevard and attempt to reprimand them into obeying the law. When that fails, Fujiyama's right-hand man Yamashita wages war in the parking lot, executing his own men who fail to subdue Joe and Frank, thus maintaining the code of silence.

Joe then stalks Fujiyama's girlfriend Jennifer and seduces her. They become intimate while several of his police comrades are tortured and killed by the Katana gang who are looking for him. Unable to contain his anger any longer, commanding officer Captain Roma sanctions an assassination of every single Katana gang member. Joe and Frank head to Fujiyama's compound and gun down every living person and a final sword battle between Joe and Yamashita ends the Katanas' reign of terror. At the end, Joe and Jennifer embrace again on the beach.

Cast
 Mathew Karedas as Joe Marshall (credited as Matt Hannon)
 Robert Z'Dar as Yamashita 
 Mark Frazer as Frank Washington
 Cranston Komuro as Fuj Fujiyama
 Janis Farley as Jennifer
 Gerald Okamura as Okamura
 Dale Cummings as Captain Roma
 Melissa Moore as Peggy

Production
The film moved swiftly into production, within a week of Amir Shervan and ex-Sylvester Stallone bodyguard Matt Hannon's first meeting. Upon walking into Shervan's office for the first time, Matt Hannon was told that he was perfect and was immediately handed the full script to the film. Despite the film being titled Samurai Cop, Hannon had no experience with weapons training, and all of his formal practice would be classified as MMA. As a result of Hannon's lack of experience and Shervan's inability to direct, all of the combat scenes were choreographed by martial arts expert Gerald Okamura, or were planned out by the actors themselves, sometimes only fifteen minutes before the scene in question was filmed.

Filming took place over several months, starting in June 1990. When actor Hannon had considered shooting to be finished, he had his hair cut short, only to be told that further shooting was to be done. Director Shervan obtained a lady's wig for the actor, which can be seen in several close up shots throughout the film. Lead actor Hannon stated that he and several other actors became frustrated with the dialogue in the film, while also expressing frustration at the lack of multiple takes. Hannon admitted to intentionally ruining takes due to his frustration, assuming that Shervan would not put them in the film, but these takes ended up in the film. A reflective Hannon was able to laugh at this, stating "so shame on me" in a 2014 interview with Red Letter Media. The shooting schedule was also poorly planned as Hannon and Mark Frazer both assumed the film was finished before Shervan called them in for reshoots in early 1991.

Amir Shervan could not afford lighting to shoot at night so the entire film is set during the day. Shervan also could only afford a handful of prop firearms (the same Ruger GP100 and Smith & Wesson Model 15 revolvers being used extensively by various actors). Actors also wore their own clothes and drove their own cars. Much of the film was shot without sound and done with single takes. Shervan had to dub voices months after production but could not get many of the bit part actors to return. Choosing to use his own voice, he warped it in post-production to sound different. His lack of ability to do this correctly resulted in ADR with a heavily robotic sound. Both lead actors, Hannon and Frazer, also supplied much of the voice over in the looping process. Hannon has stated in an interview with Red Letter Media that, "Amir did about 80% of the ADR voices." During these ADR sessions, Amir would film much of the necessary pick up shots, all from within the office. This is why many of the inserts of Frazer and Hannon in the film seem to be shot from the same corner of an office, which doesn't match with the rest of the location for any given scene.

Release
Director/Producer Amir Shervan took the film to the American Film Market (AFM) in the hopes of finding a distributor to buy the final product and give it a proper release. The film was never given a proper theatrical release, however Polish distributor Demel International Corporation released it in Europe on VHS. It was released on DVD by Media Blasters in 2004 and on DVD in 2013 and Blu-ray in 2014 by Cinema Epoch.

There were rumors that the initial released cut of Samurai Cop was a print that had been found in a castle. Gregory Hatanaka, the founder of Cinema Epoch, and the one who owns the rights to the initial Samurai Cop film, claimed that this story was only partially true. The original 35mm print of the film was discovered by an employee of Hatanaka's in a vault that was specifically meant to store reels of film and preserve them. It was assumed that Shervan had stored the print for Samurai Cop as well as a few of his other films in this vault where they were happened upon by chance.

On March 25, 2016, Samurai Cop was released as a VOD title by RiffTrax. The RiffTrax edition received a two-day theatrical release in April 2017, provided by Fathom Events.

Reception and legacy
Samurai Cop began its ascent into cult status when what would become known as "The Horny Nurse Scene" began circulating the internet. This was thanks to YouTube and also being sent around by action-movie fans, believing that they had found what they could consider the next greatest "so bad it's good" film since The Room.

Since its release, the film has developed a cult following. The staff of Ain't It Cool News wrote that "it might be amongst the worst films ever released to market, but therein lies every reason why it's so...fun to watch." Oktay Ege Kozak of DVD Talk referred to it as a "so bad it's good" movie, calling it "ineptly made yet unintentionally hilarious and fascinating from the first frame to the last. [...] Every scene in Samurai Cop is chock full of mistakes and baffling decisions that extra nitpicky fans of bad movies should have a field day exploring." Jim Vorel of Paste wrote that the film is "rightfully hailed as [Amir Shervan's] terrible magnum opus", and concluded: "The whole thing looks like a movie aliens would make if they were lacking some sort of crucial understanding of how human beings communicated with one another."

Sequel

Gregory Hatanaka, founder of Cinema Epoch, has produced and directed a sequel, Samurai Cop 2: Deadly Vengeance, which was released in 2015.

 The lead actor of Samurai Cop, Mathew Karedas, (who is credited as Matt Hannon) was believed by many fans of the cult hit to have died in the early 2000s, around the same time that Shervan had died. Karedas' daughter, who was a film student at the time Samurai Cop was reaching its peak cult status, had done some internet digging and had realized that fans had started the rumor that her father had died. She convinced Karedas to make a video in which he informed the world that he was still alive. He disclosed in an interview with Red Letter Media that he had sent her a video of him explaining his real thoughts on Samurai Cop and that he was in fact still alive. She then immediately took that video and posted it online, and the internet began to buzz with articles and videos of countless reactions to the fact that the Samurai Cop was alive and well.

Hatanaka, who owned the rights to the original film, was already working on a sequel, Samurai Cop 2: Deadly Vengeance, prior to the revelation that Hannon was still alive. Upon finding out that Hannon was still alive, Hatanaka quickly got him on board the project and production was ready to begin.

References

External links
 
 
 RiffTrax treatment on official YouTube channel

1991 direct-to-video films
1990s action films
1990s buddy cop films
1990s crime action films
American buddy cop films
American crime action films
American direct-to-video films
American independent films
1990s English-language films
Fictional portrayals of the Los Angeles Police Department
Films set in Los Angeles
Films shot in Los Angeles
American martial arts films
Yakuza films
American exploitation films
1991 films
Japan in non-Japanese culture
1990s rediscovered films
Rediscovered American films
1990s American films